The boys' Super-G competition of the 2016 Winter Youth Olympics was held at the Hafjell Olympic Slope near Lillehammer, Norway, on Saturday, 13 February.

Results
The race was started at 12:00.

References

Boys' Super-G